Francisco Labastida Ochoa (born 14 August 1942) is a Mexican economist and politician affiliated with the Institutional Revolutionary Party (PRI), who became the first presidential candidate of his party to lose a presidential election, which he did in the 2000 presidential election to Vicente Fox.

Labastida was born to Gloria Ochoa de Labastida and Eduardo Labastida Kofahl. His wife, Teresa Uriarte, was director of UNAM's Institute of Aesthetics Research. His great-grandfather fought on the side of Mexican President Benito Juárez in the War of Reform, and his grandfather was Governor of Sinaloa as well as federal deputy.

Labastida served as governor of Sinaloa (1987–1992), defeating Manuel Clouthier of the National Action Party. During and after his tenure as governor, Labastida was accused of protecting Sinaloan drug traffickers and overlooking their activities.

Labastida was Secretary of Energy during the administration of Miguel de la Madrid. He was also Secretary of Agriculture and Secretary of the Interior during the administration of Ernesto Zedillo.

After losing the 2000 presidential election, he served as president of the Centro de Estudios para el Desarrollo de México.  In the 2006 general election, he was elected to the Senate for the PRI, representing Sinaloa.

Publications
 Las Razones de la Política
 Planeación para el Desarrollo

Awards
National Order of Merit Grand Officer, of the government of France
Great Cross of Brazil
Medal of the Mexican Supreme Court

References

External links
 

1942 births
Living people
Mexican people of Basque descent
Governors of Sinaloa
Mexican economists
Members of the Senate of the Republic (Mexico)
Candidates in the 2000 Mexican presidential election
Mexican Secretaries of the Interior
Mexican Secretaries of Agriculture
Mexican Secretaries of Energy
Politicians from Sinaloa
People from Los Mochis
National Autonomous University of Mexico alumni
Institutional Revolutionary Party politicians
21st-century Mexican politicians
20th-century Mexican politicians